Year 1140 (MCXL) was a leap year starting on Monday (link will display the full calendar) of the Julian calendar.

Events 
 By place 

 Levant 
 Spring – King Fulk of Jerusalem confronts Imad al-Din Zengi, Seljuk ruler (atabeg) of Mosul, near Dara'a in southern Syria. Turkish forces under Mu'in al-Din (supported by the Crusaders) besiege Banias.

 Europe 
 Spring – King Conrad III enfeoffs Henry II (Jasomirgott), a member of the House of Babenberg, with the County Palatine of the Rhine (belonging to the Holy Roman Empire). 
 Summer – King Roger II promulgates the Assizes of Ariano (a series of laws to rule the Norman Kingdom of Sicily) after the pacification of southern Italy.
 December 21 – Siege of Weinsberg: Conrad III captures the castle at Weinsberg during the civil war between the Staufers and the Welfs in Germany.

 England 
 Summer – King Stephen appoints Geoffrey de Mandeville as Earl of Essex for his support during the civil war against Matilda (Stephen's cousin).
 The town of Lanark in Scotland is made a Royal Burgh by King David I, giving it merchant privileges relating to government and taxation.

 Asia 
 August 21 – Battle of Yancheng: Chinese forces under the command of Yue Fei defeat a numerically superior Jin army led by Wuzhu during the Jin–Song Wars.

 By topic 

 Religion 
 June 3 – Pierre Abelard, a French theologian, is condemned for heresy by the Council of Sens. He sets out for Rome to present his defense to Pope Innocent II.
 September 8 – Sephardi Jewish philosopher Judah Halevi, having completed the Kuzari, arrives in Alexandria on a pilgrimage to Palestine.
 The first Cistercian monastery in Spain is founded in Fitero. The order enjoys a rapid expansion in the region in the following 15 years.

 Literature 
 Gratian, an Italian monk and canon lawyer, founds the science of Canon law with the publication of the Decretum Gratiani (approximate date).

Births 
 May 28 – Xin Qiji, Chinese military leader (d. 1207)
 Adela of Champagne, queen of France (d. 1206)
 Alan Fitz Walter, Scottish High Steward (d. 1204)
 Cadfan ap Cadwaladr, Welsh nobleman (d. 1215)
 Davyd Rostislavich, Kievan Grand Prince (d. 1197)
 Domhnall Caomhánach, king of Leinster (d. 1175)
 Eliezer ben Joel HaLevi, German rabbi (d. 1225)
 Fujiwara no Tashi, Japanese empress (d. 1202)
 Gerard de Ridefort, Flemish Grand Master (d. 1189)
 Hedwig, margravine of Meissen (approximate date)
 Hugh de Paduinan, Norman nobleman (d. 1189)
 John I, archbishop of Trier (approximate date)
 John I, Norman nobleman (approximate date) 
 John of Ford, English Cistercian abbot (d. 1224)
 Manfred II, marquess of Saluzzo (approximate date)
 Minamoto no Yoshihira, Japanese nobleman (d. 1160)
 Peter Waldo, French spiritual leader (d. 1205)
 Raymond III, crusader and count of Tripoli (d. 1187)
 Raymond the Palmer, Italian pilgrim (d. 1200) 
 Simon II, duke of Lorraine (approximate date)
 Sophia of Minsk, queen of Denmark (d. 1198)
 Walter Map, Welsh clergyman and writer (d. 1210)
 William FitzRalph, English High Sheriff (d. 1200)
 Yuan Cai, Chinese scholar and official (d. 1195)

Deaths 
 January 12 – Louis I, German nobleman
 February 6 – Thurstan, archbishop of York
 February 14 
 Leo I, prince of Armenia
 Soběslav I, duke of Bohemia
 August 21 – Yang Zaixing, Chinese general
 August 31 – Godebold, bishop of Meissen
 September 15 – Adelaide, duchess of Bohemia
 November 16 – Wulgrin II, count of Angoulême
 Aibert, French monk and hermit (b. 1060)
 Baldwin of Rieti, Italian Benedictine abbot 
 Diego Gelmírez, Galician archbishop (b. 1069)
 Gaucherius, French priest and hermit (b. 1060)
 Hugh the Chanter, English historian and writer
 Kumarapala, Indian ruler of the Pala Empire
 Lhachen Naglug, Indian ruler of Ladakh (b. 1110)
 Li Gang, Chinese Grand Chancellor (b. 1083)
 Toba Sōjō, Japanese artist-monk (b. 1053)
 Wanyan Xiyin, Chinese chief adviser

References